Herman Parker "Bo" Olcott (January 1, 1879 – November 3, 1929) was an American football player and coach. He played college football at Yale University, where he was an All-American in 1900 at center. Olcott was the head football coach at the University of North Carolina at Chapel Hill 1902 to 1903, New York University (NYU) from 1907 to 1912, and the University of Kansas, from 1915 to 1917. He was the head coach of the Great Lakes Navy Bluejackets football team, which represented the Naval Station Great Lakes, for the first three games of the 1918 season. Olcott died on November 3, 1929, in Wallingford, Connecticut, after a three-year illness.

Head coaching record

Notes

References

1879 births
1929 deaths
American football centers
Great Lakes Navy Bluejackets football coaches
Kansas Jayhawks football coaches
North Carolina Tar Heels football coaches
NYU Violets football coaches
Yale Bulldogs football players
All-American college football players
Players of American football from New York City